Leonīds Tambijevs (born September 26, 1970 in Riga, Soviet Union) is a former professional ice hockey  left winger, currently serving as the head coach of Admiral Vladivostok in the Kontinental Hockey League (KHL).

Playing career
Tambijevs began his career with the Dinamo Riga youth team. As a junior he played with several Latvian teams. He debuted at the USSR Tier III level with RASMS-Energo, but soon joined USSR top level team Leningrad SKA for the 1990/1991 season. He then returned to Riga where had played until 1995 with ex-USSR league premier level teams Stars Riga and Pardaugava Riga.

After the disbanding of Riga premier league teams in 1995, Tambijevs moved abroad and played with Denmark team Hvidovre IK. A career highpoint includes a spot with Finnish SM-liiga at Rauma Lukko. He then played in Germany, Denmark, Russia, Switzerland, Italy, and spent his final season with EV Zeltweg in Austria

Tambijevs has an extensive Latvian national ice hockey team career. He made his debut at the first official renewed national teams' game in 1992 and has played at every world championship, Olympic qualifier and Olympic Games for the Latvian team until 2007. On 13 April 2007 in a Latvian game against Finland, Tambijevs and Aleksandrs Semjonovs became the first two players to play 200 games for the Latvia national team. He has played the most games and scored the most points for the national team.

Coaching career
Tambijevs has previously coached Saryarka Karagandy.

Career statistics

Regular season and playoffs

International

References

External links 
 

1970 births
Living people
Amur Khabarovsk players
EHC Basel players
ECH Chur players
Expatriate ice hockey players in Russia
Hvidovre Ligahockey players
Ice hockey players at the 2002 Winter Olympics
Ice hockey players at the 2006 Winter Olympics
Iserlohn Roosters players
Latvian expatriates in Russia
Latvian ice hockey left wingers
Lukko players
HC Merano players
EHC Olten players
Olympic ice hockey players of Latvia
Rødovre Mighty Bulls players
SKA Saint Petersburg players
Ice hockey people from Riga
Tappara players
Torpedo Nizhny Novgorod players
Latvian ice hockey coaches
Latvian sports coaches
Soviet ice hockey players